The 2016 Alaska Democratic presidential caucuses were held on March 26 in the U.S. state of Alaska as one of the Democratic Party's primaries ahead of the 2016 presidential election.

On the same day, Democratic caucuses were held in Hawaii and in the state of Washington. The Republican Party did not hold any primaries that day; their own Alaska caucuses took place on March 1, 2016.

Opinion polling

Results

Analysis 

Alaska gave Sanders his largest win outside of his home state of Vermont. He won 80% of the vote and 82% of the state convention delegates, and carried every borough and census area in the state by landslide margins. He swept Democratic strongholds - including sparsely populated areas in the Bush - as well as GOP strongholds such as Fairbanks and surrounding Interior Alaska, Anchorage on the Kenai Peninsula, and Juneau in the Southeast.

A Sanders win in Alaska was expected, since he generally performed well in caucus states, in majority white electorates, and in the Pacific Northwest. Also, Clinton had lost the state eight years before to Barack Obama, and she did not campaign personally in the state (Sanders did not either, but he sent his wife Jane to campaign for him in Anchorage).

At a rally in Wisconsin on March 26, Sanders told supporters “We knew from day one that politically we were going to have a hard time in the Deep South, but we knew things were going to improve when we headed west.”

References

2016
Democratic primary
Alaska
March 2016 events in the United States